Igor Yemeleyev (born 7 March 1981) is a Russian professional ice hockey player who is currently playing with Avtomobilist Yekaterinburg in the Kontinental Hockey League (KHL).

Yemeleyev competed at the 2006 IIHF World Championship as a member of the Russia men's national ice hockey team.

References

External links

1981 births
Living people
Avtomobilist Yekaterinburg players
HC CSKA Moscow players
HC Dynamo Moscow players
Metallurg Magnitogorsk players
HC Neftekhimik Nizhnekamsk players
Russian ice hockey centres
Severstal Cherepovets players
SKA Saint Petersburg players
HC Yugra players
Sportspeople from Yaroslavl